A Famiclone is any clone console of the Nintendo Entertainment System (NES), known in Japan as the Family Computer or Famicom. They are electronic hardware devices designed to replicate the workings of, and play games designed for, the NES and Famicom. Hundreds of unauthorized clones and unlicensed copies have been made available since the height of the NES popularity in the late 1980s. The technology employed in such clones has evolved over the years: while the earliest clones feature a printed circuit board containing custom or third party integrated circuits (ICs), more recent (post-1996) clones utilize single chip designs, with a custom ASIC which simulates the functionality of the original hardware, and often includes one or more on-board games. Most devices originate in China and Taiwan, and less commonly South Korea.

In some locales, especially former Eastern Bloc, former Soviet Union countries, South America, various Asian countries, and Africa such systems could occasionally be found side by side with official Nintendo hardware, but clones were cheaper and had wider availability of softwareso such clones were the easiest available console gaming systems. Elsewhere, these systems were often prompting swift legal action. Many of these early systems were similar to the NES or Famicom not only in functionality, but also in appearance, often featuring little more than a new name and logo in place of Nintendo's branding. In contrast, in former Yugoslavia NES clones often visually resembled Mega Drive, together with the Sega logo.

Few of these systems were openly marketed as "NES compatible". Some of the packaging features screenshots from more recent and more powerful systems, which are adorned with misleading, or even outright false, quotes such as "ultimate videogame technlology" [sic] or "crystal clear digital sound, multiple colors and advanced 3D graphics". Some manufacturers opt for a less misleading approach, describing the system generically as a "TV game", "8-bit console", "multi-game system", or "Plug & Play", but even these examples generally say nothing to suggest any compatibility with NES hardware. They would often be distributed along pirate multicarts.

Types
Because NES clones are not officially licensed, they vary in areas such as hardware quality, available games and overall performance. Most clones are produced extremely cheaply, while a few are comparable to first-party hardware in their manufacture quality. In terms of appearance and basic build, there are four general types of clones:

Console type
Many clones are designed to resemble the original Famicom, but others have been produced to look like almost all other consoles from the NES, SNES, and Mega Drive/Genesis to the Xbox and PlayStation 3, and others simply in a generic console shape. Usually it is easy to tell a Famiclone from the real hardware it imitates by the presence of either alternate coloring, brand names which do not match the real console's, or weak construction. Console type clones almost always utilize cartridges, and they are usually compatible with real Famicom (60 pin) or NES (72 pin) games, as well as custom-made carts (especially multi-carts, unauthorized game cartridges which hold a multitude of games as opposed to just one, which are often included with console-type clones). Console Famiclones are most popular in Asia, parts of Europe and Latin America, with few actively sold in North America due to stronger enforcement of the copyrights in the games typically packaged with a Famiclone and of the design patents in the imitated consoles.

Multi-console type

Consoles such as the Retron 3 include multiple consoles in one clone.

Handheld type

These types of systems contain a built-in LCD screen and are usually powered by batteries, therefore acting as a completely portable handheld system.

One of the first handheld clones is the Top Guy, although only a small number are known to exist. More widely distributed was Redant's Game Axe, which was manufactured in several revisions through the 1990s. Game Theory Admiral featured an improved TFT screen and closely resembled the Game Boy Advance or Wintech GOOD BOY - not to be confused with a Famicom clone also called Good Boy - design look like Game Boy Color. However, this smaller design included a smaller cartridge port; it was supplied with an adapter to allow the use of standard Famicom cartridges with the system.  One of the more recent handheld clones is Gametech's PocketFami, the first to be actively marketed as a portable Famicom by its manufacturers, and one of the most widely distributed thanks to the new legitimate status of Famicom clone products.

There are also a number of famiclones in the shape of a Game Boy or similar, but which can only display NES/Famicom games on a TV, and have a simple LCD game in the screen area. such example is the NES Clone "GameKids Advance", which resembles an older Game Boy Advance, and has a built-in LCD game, powered by 2 AA batteries, or the included AC adapter. However, the NES games can only be played on TV using the AC adapter. It uses a game cartridge, similar to those from a Game Boy/Game Boy Color, and also includes an adapter to play NES games.

PocketFami
The Pocket Fami, also known as Pocket Famicom (although this name was never used by the manufacturers as Famicom is a trademark of Nintendo) and Pokefami (ポケファミ) is an unlicensed handheld hardware clone of the Famicom produced by GameTech and released in 2004.

The PocketFami features a standard D-pad and six buttons: the four standard NES buttons (A, B, select, and start), plus two additional "turbo" buttons. It features a 2.5 inch backlit LCD screen capable of displaying both NTSC and PAL video. It has one headphone jack, an RCA composite output jack, and can be powered either through 3 AA batteries or AC adapter. Because of the different cartridge pin design of the Japanese Famicom (60 pins) and the international NES (72 pins), international (North American, Australian, European) cartridges cannot be played without an additional converter.

Nintendo sued GameTech over production of the PocketFami, claiming that the device violated their patents on the Famicom's hardware. The courts found in favor of GameTech and allowed the device to be sold in Japan, as the original Famicom was first sold in 1983 and most of Nintendo's essential patents on the system had expired.

Controller type

This type of hardware clone, popular in North America and western Europe, is designed to hold all the console's hardware in the shape of a regular game console controller, usually the Nintendo 64's.  Also known as "NES-on-a-chip" due to their extremely miniaturized hardware (relative to the original NES), these controllers usually shun or at least downplay a game cartridge interface in favor of storing games directly in internal memory chips.  These Famiclones can often run on battery as well as AC power, making them popular for portable usage.  These clones have become especially popular in the USA thanks to the new "TV-Games" fad of selling legitimately emulated classic arcade games in a traditional-looking controller. (Atari games are especially common.) Controller clones can usually be found in places like flea markets, mall kiosks, or independent toy stores, and most people who sell and buy them are unaware or do not care that they are in fact illegally made. In Brazil this type of console is commercialized with the name GunBoy.

The Power Player Super Joy III consoles (also known as Power Games and XA-76-1E) are a line of unauthorized handheld Nintendo Entertainment System/Famicom clones manufactured by NRTRADE that are sold in North America, Brazil, Europe, Asia, and Australia. The system resembles a Nintendo 64 controller and attaches to a TV set. The second controller resembles a Sega Genesis controller, and a light gun is also included. NTSC, PAL and SECAM versions are available. They all use a custom "NES-on-a-chip" (NOAC) that is an implementation of the NES's hardware (Custom 6502, PPU, PAPU, etc.). The consoles came with 76 built-in games, although marketing frequently claims to have 1,000+ ways of playing them. Most of the included games were originally released for the NES or Famicom, but some have been created by the manufacturer to expand their list of included games. Most of the games have had their title screen graphics removed to save space on the ROM chip, not to mention a company logo removal trick for reduced liability. After this product gained some popularity, the Power Player 3.5, an improved model with more games, was released.  A wireless version of Power Games was also released.

Playervision or Game Stick is another unauthorized Nintendo Entertainment System hardware clone built into a gamepad and sold in South America, and is just one version of Power Player Super Joy III, nevertheless, the name of the product varies on and in the box, user manual and the gamepad video game console itself. For example, the instruction sheet calls it "Playervision", but the system itself says "Players". This video game console has no cartridge slot, or an input for a second player controller or Zapper. This means that some of the games included can't be used because of the need of a gun (Duck Hunt, for example). The system includes the same 76 games as Power Player Super Joy III, but some of them are repeated or are graphical hacks (Teletubbies, for example, is just Mario Bros. with graphic changes).

Computer type

These Famiclones are designed to resemble either 1980s home computers, modern keyboards, or the real Famicom's BASIC kit. Usually, these clones consist of the same hardware as the console type, but put inside a keyboard instead of a console lookalike. They are usually supplied with a cartridge containing some computer-style software, such as a simple word processor and a version of BASIC (most common are G-BASIC, a counterfeit version of Family BASIC, and F-BASIC, an original but more limited version), and some "educational" typing and mathematics games. Some even include a computer mouse and a GUI-style interface. Note that, while the interface is similar to Nintendo's Family BASIC keyboard, clone keyboards are generally not fully compatible with official software (and vice versa) due to differing key layouts.

Software game titles
Since none of these unlicensed clones contain the 10NES authentication chip, most are capable of running games which an official NES model would not run. In addition, many modern NES clones come with a built-in selection of games, typically stored on an internal ROM which can range from 128 KB up to several megabytes in size.

These built-in games are usually designed to complement, rather than replace, the traditional cartridge slot, although some devices omit such a slot entirely, allowing only the built-in games to be played. Typical numbers for the built-in "distinct" games range from as low as three to as high as fifty or one hundred games for more expensive products. The number of "distinct games" is important, because while many NES clones claim to have thousands of built-in games, most of these games are usually nothing more than hacks that allow the player to start the same game at different levels or with different numbers of lives.

The games are usually direct unlicensed copies of official NES and Famicom game titles, usually with copyright information removed and sometimes featuring other minor changes. The most commonly found games in NES clones are generally games below 64 K of ROM size and which can be easily split into distinct subgames or levels. As such, Track & Field and Circus Charlie are present in a large percentage of NES clones, usually blown up to count as 6 or 7 "distinct" games each. Duck Hunt (often with its clay shooting mode shown as a separate game) is also a common NES clone feature as they justify the existence of the light gun accessory. Other popular, although less common choices, are Super Mario Bros. hacks, Excitebike, Tetris, Magic Jewelry (an unlicensed clone of Columns), older sports titles and miscellaneous platform games. Additionally, some clones incorporate games which, although they may initially appear to be original, are in fact counterfeit copies featuring extensive graphical (and sometimes audio) modifications. Examples of this include UFO Race, based on Nintendo's F-1 Race, Pandamar (also known as simply Panda), based on Super Mario Bros., Ladangel, based on Hudson Soft's Challenger and UFO Shoot, based on Duck Hunt.

However, some systems include legally licensed games; for example, the Rumble Station's 15 built-in games are licensed from Color Dreams, and Sachen's Q-Boy includes only its own original titles. A growing number of recent clones, such as those marketed by Technologies in the United States, contain large numbers of original games made by developers in China.

Hardware and software compatibility

While most Famiclones will run most original licensed Nintendo software and work with most original carts (being even more versatile than an original NES because of the lack of regional lockout chips and sometimes having a dual 60-pin and 72-pin cartridge compatibility), the degree of hardware compatibility with original NES accessories and miscellaneous hardware equipment may vary, and even software level compatibility is not always perfect.

The most common software-level incompatibility in the built-in games that some sport, is the lack of save RAM, causing the few games that use it to fail when trying to save or load data.

Since most modern Famiclones are based on the NES-on-a-chip ASIC, they automatically inherit all of its limitations, which includes graphical glitches and compatibility issues.

At a hardware level, the most common incompatibility is the lack, in some Famiclones, of the original Famicom's expansion port (although it is always present, at least at a logical level, and in some clones it is internally hardwired; e.g. in computer-type Famiclones it is hardwired to the built-in keyboard, even if not externally accessible).

Some Famiclones also use standard Atari 9-pin shaped or even 15-pin joypad connectors instead of the proprietary NES connectors, and their controllers usually offer all of the functionality of a standard NES controller and sometimes features such as "slow motion" or several autofire keys with different speeds, which are not present on the standard out-of-the-box NES joypads.  Despite being physically identical to Atari 9-pin, the protocol is different: Atari uses a parallel protocol where each wire carries the status of a single button, and Famiclones uses the same 4021-based serial protocol the original NES used. Connecting standard controllers to them may result in malfunction or damage of the controller or the Famiclone itself.

Lastly, like many modern consoles and other devices meant to be connected to a TV, many modern famiclones lack an RF modulator and instead only have separate audio and composite video outputs (sometimes S-Video), also to cut on the (already low) production costs.

Some manufacturers have added new backward-compatible features to their NOAC ASICs, which allow developers to add new features like an improved processor (a 65C816 compatible), better graphics, stereo sound (by adding another audio unit), PCM audio, and a unified bus (OneBus) which lets manufacturers use a single ROM to store games instead of the two (one for program and other for graphics) the original NES and Famicom used.

Post-patent Famiclones

Some of Nintendo's patents on the Famicom expired in 2003, followed in 2005 by NES-specific patents such as those covering the 10NES lockout chip. While Nintendo still holds various related trademarks, NES hardware clones are no longer necessarily illegal on the basis of patent infringement. This matter is complicated by the effect of different patents awarded in different countries, with different expiration dates. Nintendo sued Gametech in 2005 for selling the PocketFami, despite the patent expiration. Nintendo lost this suit. However, Famiclone manufacturers who incorporate copyrighted games into the unit may still be subject to legal liability on that basis, due to copyrights having much longer terms than patents (in most countries creative works such as games are automatically in copyright for many decades, sometimes up to 95 years after their creation).

While the old-style Famiclones continue to be found, the newly legitimized market has seen several clones that openly advertise support for original Famicom or NES games (or sometimes both), a feature not usually publicized by previous clones, which were often marketed as cheap gifts rather than Famicom-compatible systems. Examples of these newer efforts include the Generation NEX, which resembles a flattened version of the original NES and supports both NES and Famicom games, Gametech's Neo-Fami (also released in both Famicom and NES compatible versions as the "FC Game Console" by Yobo Gameware), and the handheld PocketFami, a more ambitious, albeit still slightly flawed, successor to the older TopGuy, GameAxe, and Game Theory Admiral. However, these more legitimate clones are still based on the same NES-on-a-chip architecture as the older systems, and as such still suffer from many of the same compatibility problems.

Generation NEX

Generation NEX is a Nintendo hardware clone released in 2005. It is compatible with Japanese Famicom and North American/European NES cartridges. A front-loading slot is used for NES games, like the original console, while a top-loading slot handles Famicom games. Messiah Entertainment Inc., a company based in Los Angeles, announced the Generation NEX in May 2005. The console was shown at the Classic Gaming Expo that August, and was scheduled for release in September 2005. The NEX is a slimmer version of the original NES, measuring an inch and a half in height. The console uses a custom-designed integrated circuit based on NES-on-a-chip, which is used by most Nintendo clone consoles. The NEX is compatible with approximately 95 percent of NES games, excluding games such as Castlevania III: Dracula's Curse. The console includes stereo sound capabilities for homebrew games.

The NEX retailed for $59.99, and included one wired controller. Wireless 2.4 GHz controllers were also produced, and were sold in sets of two at a cost of $50 per set. The wired and wireless controllers were redesigned from the original NES controller, having an appearance more similar to the SNES controller. The console includes controller ports that allow the user to plug in and use original NES controllers instead, and the wireless NEX controllers are also compatible with the original NES. The NEX is also compatible with all other NES accessories, such as the Zapper gun. Messiah also produced a wireless arcade stick controller.

The Generation NEX initially received a negative reception from user reviews and some game websites. Complaints were made regarding the console's compatibility with NES/Famicom games, which exhibited graphical and audio issues in some cases when played on the NEX. Critics also disliked the soft, squishy buttons on the redesigned controllers. The NEX's importer, Lik Sang, canceled its pre-orders in November 2005, following the console's poor reception. Reviewers for IGN gave a positive review. They considered the console an improved version of the original NES, while writing that the new counterpart did not present any noticeable graphic issues. Christopher Grant of Engadget was critical of IGN's review, noting that it did not address the compatibility issues brought up in other reviews. Grant wrote, "IGN devotes the majority of the review to the pretty packaging, nice design, and wireless controllers, glossing over the compatibility. Don't they know: it's the games, stupid."

Shane Hirschman of CraveOnline reviewed the console a year after its release, and he also considered it an improvement over the original NES: "Given the Generation NEX's inexpensive price, high-quality, and efficient game play, gamers of all types will be pleased to see the NES is back and better than ever." Ben Kuchera of Ars Technica also reviewed the console a year after its release, and gave a mixed review. Kuchera found few issues involving graphics and audio, but he also considered the console's $60 price too high. Kuchera preferred the feel of the original NES controllers, and considered the wireless controllers too expensive as well. Kuchera subsequently wrote that the Generation NEX "muddies the image so badly" that "you're doing yourself a disservice by playing the games so compromised."

Patents
These are Nintendo Entertainment System related patents:

Utility patents

Clones by region or country

Argentina
The "Family Game" was manufactured by the Argentine company Electrolab. They distributed Super Family Electrolab Ending-Man (based on Ending-Man Terminator clone) and Electrolab Family Game with official distribution of Supervision. At the peak of its popularity, its sales amounted 95% of the argentinian console market.

Another popualar brand of Famiclones were made by Bit Argentina and that is Bitgame, Super Bitgame and Video Racer. In 1992, Nintendo entered the Argentina market with H.Briones Argentina S.A. as representativeand Bit Argentina was awarded as official distributor with the rights to still sell famiclones..

Other known consoles are NTD Family Game (distributed by NTD Electronica Argentina), Son Son, Froggy Family Game (distributed by BTE Electronics SA) and Rasti (distributed by Rasti SA)

Baltic States
The most known clone in these countries is Zhiliton which looks like the Sega Mega Drive model I. Due to the small market of these countries, there are also other clones such as Dendy, UFO, Subor, Liko, Terminator 2 and Fei Hao. In 1994, Steepler, Dendy producer, reached an agreement with Nintendo to sell consoles in all post-Soviet states with relinquished its claim to Dendy sales, meaning that Nintendo didn't take legal action against famiclones.

Belarus
One of the first clones that arrived to Belarus was Zhiliton. Later Dendy was released, which was the most popular clone in this region. In 1994, Steepler, Dendy producer, reached an agreement with Nintendo to sell consoles in all post-Soviet states with relinquished its claim to Dendy sales, meaning that Nintendo didn't take legal action against famiclones.

Brazil
Since 1989, Famicom- and NES-compatible consoles were made and sold in Brazil by local companies, some of which also imported and sold original NES cartridges and consoles. The first Famicom-compatible system, called Dynavision 2, was released in 1989 by Dynacom and used joysticks similar to the Atari 2600. The next system, Dynavision 3, had gamepads similar to Sega Mega Drive gamepads and had a dual slot that allowed both 60-pin and 72-pin cartridges. This was followed in the mid-1990s by Handyvision, a portable system that allowed video to be broadcast to the TV with an UHF transmitter. Another company, Geniecom, produced a black-colored clone with headphone jacks on gamepads, and Game Genie code input. The NASA clone was similar to the original NES, but had two slots, a 72-pin on the front and a 60-pin on top. Brazilian manufacturers also produced cartridges, but ran into the problem of having two formats. Hydron company solved the issue by making two-sided cartridges - one side 60-pin, the other 72-pin.

In 1993, Nintendo themselves arrived in Brazil and released the NES with the American cartridge slot. This official version was manufactured by Playtronic, a joint venture between the toy company Estrela and Gradiente.

China
In China, the sale of official Famicom consoles was limited to imports, which created a large grey market for Famiclone consoles and games. The most popular Famiclone consoles was by Subor, which sold millions until their decline in the late 1990s.

Colombia
In Colombia, console named "Creation" or "Super Creation" and "nichi-man" were popular, later on, the PolyStation. The "nichi-man" console was manufactured by Micro Genius.  Nintendo arrived in Colombia in early 1990s with help of ab compufax.

Also, a recent famiclone, and of the Nintendo Switch, is the Nanica Smitch. It has 800 NES games built in, and has removable controllers, but the controllers look like Joy-Con, but instead the thumbsticks are replaced with d-pads. However, this famiclone is available just in Colombia.

Czech Republic/Slovakia
Most known clones sold in this country are Teminator 2, Bel Game, Pegasus IQ-502, Video Game-GT3300 and Micro Genius. Nintendo entered Czechoslovakian market in 1992 with Game Boy, and in the next year, after split into two countries, Nintendo released SNES and NES. It is unknown if distributor took legal actions against famiclones resellers.

Former Yugoslavia

First clones were sold as Family Computer and they were simple clones that looked like Famicom. When Sega released Mega Drive in Former Yugoslavian republics, most pirates wanted to mislead buyers giving a cheaper and similar looking clone, mostly called "Terminator". Nintendo created distribiution network in every country of the region between 1992-1995. In some of the countries, Nintendo took legal action against shop that sold this clones, but in other countries, distributors of Nintendo didn't react.

Greece
In the late 1980s/early 1990s, Greek Software disitributed BIT 72, which was one of the few clones that could play only NES cartridges. The console competite with officially distributed Sega Master System. In 1991, Nintendo entered the Greek market and after that, most of the famiclones on the market were cheap imitations of SNES called SP-60.

Iceland
Nintendo was in this region form early 1980s, but stores distributed clones like Crazyboy, Redstone, Nasa (compatible with NES), Action Set, NTDEC etc.

India
In 1987, Nintendo released the NES under the name Samurai marketed by Samurai Electronics. Following poor sales of the license-built NES consoles, Samurai-branded Famiclones produced by Micro Genius began to appear in the early 1990s.

In the late 1990s, the demand for 8-bit clones became very high in India. There were around 55 brands in the country at the time such as Media Entertainment System (selling Little Master and Wiz Kid), Mitashi (selling Cricket), Mega and others.

Iran
The most popular brand of clones were these, made by Micro Genius (simply called here Micro) and distributed from 1992. One of the most popular games were Super Mario Bros. (called locally Mushroom Eater), Contra, Duck Hunt, Double Dragon, Mega Man etc. Other clones include consoles like Super Semtoni.

Mongolia
Famiclones were brought to Mongolia from China and the most popular is Subor.

Poland

Main article: Pegasus

In Poland, Pegasus was marketed by established in 1991, BobMark International.. In it's lifespan, BobMark sold three models: MT-777DX, Super Pegasus and IQ-502. In 1994, changes in Polish copyright law resulted that BobMark get rid of bootleg games and bought official license to software published by Codemasters, Sachen and Western Technologies and distribute them in Asian cartridges.In late 1994, Nintendo entered Polish market so BobMark began to sell official Sega products. From that time Pegasus brand began to slowly lose it's importants due to more cheaper clones and new generation consoles with last models sold until late 1990s.

Another popular and the most common Famiclone in Poland is the BS-500AS, also known as Terminator, along with some other clones, such as Gold Leopard King or Polystation.

Nintendo took legal actions against small sellers of famiclones and cartridges producers, but they never sued Pegasus distributors.

Romania
In Romania, several NES clones could be found in toy stores under marketing names such as Polystation, Terminator, or variations of Famicom BASIC keyboard compatible consoles and these consoles were shipped with games such as '999999 in 1' which consisted of around 6 games in one cartridge and the rest were different levels of these games. The games and series consisted mainly of Super Mario, Bomberman, Lunar Pool, Double Dragon 3, Star Soldier, and Ninja Ryukenden 3. 

Nintendo entered Romanian market in mid 1990s, but they didn't bother with famiclone sellers.

Russia

Main article: Dendy

The Dendy (Russian: Де́нди) was a hardware clone of the Nintendo Entertainment System (NES) popular in Russia. Dendy is an NTSC console with forced PAL mode, like Pegasus. Released in 1992 by the Steepler company, the Dendy was easily the most popular video game console of its time there, and enjoyed a degree of fame roughly equivalent to that experienced by the NES/Famicom in North America and Japan. Business was so successful that the company spawned its own TV show about Dendy on Russian TV, and created stores all across Moscow and St. Petersburg, promoting and selling the console and its cartridges. Also, a cartoon about the "Dendy Elephant", the character on the console's logo, was filmed but not finished.

In 1994, Steepler, Dendy producer, reached an agreement with Nintendo to sell consoles in all post-Soviet states with relinquished its claim to Dendy sales, meaning that Nintendo didn't take legal action against famiclones.

Dendy had competition in form of Subor, Bitman and Kenga. After Dendy there were also other clones like Simba and Magistr.

South Africa
In South Africa, clones, known as "TV Games", are still widely available. One popular clone available in the early 1990s was the Golden China; while another was Reggie's Entertainment System, named after the toy store chain that sold it; the most recent clone was the TeleGamestation. Older models looked like the Famicom but newer models resembled the PlayStation, as well as the controllers—but with the cartridges being entered from the top. A "mini tower" version was also launched with keyboard, and black/white monitor, to include educational software. These TeleGamestations have cartridges around half the size of the original Nintendo Entertainment System games, and although most games were cracked from there, some were also taken from the Master System. The box advertises "dazzling graphics" and the monitor on the box set features a modern-day soccer game. Games could be bought in all chain stores "legally", or unlicensed games (mainly from China) could be bought on the market or certain stores. Most cartridges were multi-packs, or many games within one cartridge. In some cases, games have had their official Nintendo or Sega names removed, and in some cases the original name of the game (for example, Dr. Mario was renamed "Medical Hospital"). Later, in 2002, the 16-bit TeleGamestation 2 was launched, and the games were taken from the Sega Mega Drive/Genesis. 

Nintendo entered South African market in 1992and took legal action against Golden China for importing copied games.

Southeast Asia
In Southeast Asia, the Micro Genius was sold as an alternative to the Famicom. It originated from Taiwan in the 1990s and uses 60-pin cartridges, most of which are multicarts. The Micro Genius had some original games, including Chinese Chess and Thunder Warrior.

Spain
In Spain, the NASA (model NS-90AP) or Creation (which are nearly the same, being the console name printed on the front the only difference) has been one of the most common NES clones. It is compatible with official NES games and Famicom games with an adapter. It can also play copied and bootleg games. This is due to the fact that it has 72-pin connector, although it does not have a zero insertion force socket as the original NES had and it lacks a 10NES lockout chip.

It originally used the same chipset as the Dendy, manufactured by United Microelectronics Corporation, but manufacturers later used the NOAC ASICs.

Turkey
The most popular brand of clones is Micro Genius. There were also smaller brands like Star Trek, Home Computer, Game Star and Fun Time.

Ukraine
One of the most known clone in this country is Dendy. There were also other brands like Kenga which were very widespread in Ukraine. Kenga even had a TV show called Kenga Predstavlyaet!

Within the Donetsk region, Atlantida company sold a Dendy competitor, the Jippy game console, which was a clone of Ending Man. The console also used a mascot similar to Dendy - a similarly dressed hippopotamus named Jippy. It had headphone jacks and switches to activate the "turbo-pause". According to various estimates, 15,000 copies were sold, including 5,000 in Moscow, Russia. A TV show Jippy Club was produced on the local Donetsk TV station. The project closed in 1994.

In 1994, Steepler, Dendy producer, reached an agreement with Nintendo to sell consoles in all post-Soviet states with relinquished its claim to Dendy sales, meaning that Nintendo didn't take legal action against famiclones.

See also
Analogue NT
Power Player Super Joy III
Polystation
PlayPower
Video game console emulator

References

External links

NES World Pirate section
Ultimate Console Database, currently 377 Famiclones
"Researchers Propose $12 Computer for Developing Countries", ABC News
Playpower, learning games for radically affordable computers
Attack of the Clones! Super Joy Review

 
Dedicated consoles